Immer derselbe Schnee und immer derselbe Onkel (English translation: Always the Same Snow and always the same Uncle) is a book of essays by Nobel Prize-winning author Herta Müller. The book was first published in Germany on March 7, 2011 through Carl Hanser Verlag.

Critical reception for the book was positive. Ö1 praised the collection, calling the title "peculiar and beautiful" and stated that her writing was "direct and pragmatic".

References

2011 German novels
Works by Herta Müller
German-language novels
Carl Hanser Verlag books